Scydmaeninae are a subfamily of small beetles, commonly called ant-like stone beetles or scydmaenines. These beetles occur worldwide, and the subfamily includes some 4,500 species in about 80 genera. Established as a family, they were reduced in status to a subfamily of Staphylinidae in 2009 

Many scydmaenine species have a narrowing between head and thorax and thorax and abdomen, resulting in a passing resemblance to ants that inspires their common name. The largest measure just 3 millimeters long, while some very small species only reach half a millimeter in length. Scydmaenids typically live in leaf litter and rotting logs in forests, preferring moist habitats. A number of types are known to feed on oribatid mites, using "hole scraping" and "cutting" techniques to get through the mite's hard shells.

In addition to the two living subfamilies, the prehistoric subfamily Hapsomelinae, known only from fossils, has been placed here.

Selected genera
Cephennium
Elacatophora Schaufuss, 1884 (including Borneosabahia)
Euconnus Thomson, 1859
Eutheia 
Horaeomorphus Schaufuss, 1889
Loeblites Franz, 1986
Microscydmus Saulcy & Croissandeau, 1893
Nevraphes
Parastenichnaphes Franz, 1984
Penicillidmus Jałoszyński, 2014
Protoscydmus Franz, 1992
Scydmaenus
Siamites Franz, 1989
Stenichnus Thomson, 1859
Synidcus Motschulsky, 1851

Extinct genera 

 Clade Cephenniitae Reitter 1882
 Tribe Cephenniini Reitter 1882
 †Praphennium Jałoszyński 2018 Burmese amber, Myanmar, Cenomanian
 Tribe Eutheiini Casey 1897
 †Archeutheia Jałoszyński and Peris 2016 El Soplao amber (Spanish amber), Spain, Albian
 Clade Mastigitae Fleming 1821
 Tribe Clidicini Casey 1897
 †Palaeoleptochromus O'Keefe 1997 Canadian amber, Foremost Formation, Campanian
 Tribe Leptochromini Jałoszyński and Brunke 2018
 †Euroleptochromus Jałoszyński 2012 Baltic amber, Eocene
 †Rovnoleptochromus Jałoszyński and Perkovsky 2016 Rovno amber, Ukraine, Eocene
 Clade Scydmaenitae Leach 1815
 †Kachinus Chatzimanolis et al. 2010  Burmese amber, Myanmar, Cenomanian
 Tribe Scydmaenini Leach 1815
 †Kuafu Yin et al. 2017 Burmese amber, Myanmar, Cenomanian
 Tribe Stenichnini Fauvel 1885
 †Cenomaniola Jałoszyński and Yamamoto 2017 Burmese amber, Myanmar, Cenomanian
 †Glaesoconnus Jałoszyński and Perkovsky 2016 Rovno amber, Ukraine, Eocene
 †Hyperstenichnus Jałoszyński and Perrichot 2017 Vendée amber, France, Turonian
 †Nuegua Yin et al. 2018 Burmese amber, Myanmar, Cenomanian
 †Pangusyndicus Yin et al. 2018 Burmese amber, Myanmar, Cenomanian
 †Scydmobisetia Jałoszyński and Yamamoto 2016 Burmese amber, Myanmar, Cenomanian
 †Taimyraphes Jałoszyński and Perkovsky 2019 Taimyr amber, Russia, Santonian
†Clade Hapsomelitae Poinar and Brown 2004
†Ektatotricha Chatzimanolis et al. 2010 Burmese amber, Myanmar, Cenomanian
†Electroatopos Chatzimanolis et al. 2010 Burmese amber, Myanmar, Cenomanian
†Hapsomela Poinar and Brown 2004 Burmese amber, Myanmar, Cenomanian
 Incertae sedis
 †Cryptodiodon Schaufuss 1890 Baltic amber, Eocene
 †Electroscydmaenus Schaufuss 1890 Baltic amber, Eocene
 †Hetereuthia Schaufuss 1890 Baltic amber, Eocene
 †Heuretus Schaufuss 1890 Baltic amber, Eocene
 †Microlynx Kohring and Schlüter 1989 Sicilian amber, Miocene
 †Palaeothia Schaufuss 1890 Baltic amber, Eocene
 †Pinitoides Motschulsky 1856 Baltic amber, Eocene
 †Scydmaenoides Motschulsky 1856 Baltic amber, Eocene
 †Semnodioceras Schaufuss 1890 Baltic amber, Eocene

References
Notes

Sources
Ross H. Arnett, Jr. and Michael C. Thomas, American Beetles (CRC Press, 2001), vol. 1

 
Beetle subfamilies